Newtownstewart St Eugene's was a Gaelic Athletic Association club. The club was based in Newtownstewart, County Tyrone, Northern Ireland.

The club concentrated on Gaelic football, with ladies Gaelic football also provided for.

In November 2019, Newtownstewart St Eugene's amalgamated with neighbouring club Dregish Pearse Óg's to form Naomh Eoghan GAC.

Achievements
 Tyrone Junior Football Championship
 2018

References

Gaelic games clubs in County Tyrone
Gaelic football clubs in County Tyrone